is a legacy utility available on some Unix and Unix-like operating systems. This utility outputs a 16-bit checksum of each argument file, as well as the number of blocks they take on disk. Two different checksum algorithms are in use. POSIX abandoned sum in favor of cksum.

Overview
The  program is generally only useful for historical interest. It is not part of POSIX. Two algorithms are typically available: a BSD checksum and a SYSV checksum. Both are weaker than the already weak 32-bit CRC used by cksum.

The default algorithm on FreeBSD and GNU implementations is the BSD checksum. Switching between the two algorithms is done via command line options.

The two commonly used algorithms are as follows.

The BSD sum, -r in GNU sum and -o1 in FreeBSD cksum:
 Initialize checksum to 0
 For each byte of the input stream
 Perform 16-bit bitwise right rotation by 1 bit on the checksum
 Add the byte to the checksum, and apply modulo 2 ^ 16 to the result, thereby keeping it within 16 bits
 The result is a 16-bit checksum
The above algorithm appeared in Seventh Edition Unix.

The System V sum, -s in GNU sum and -o2 in FreeBSD cksum:
 checksum0 = sum of all bytes of the input stream modulo 2 ^ 32
 checksum1 = checksum0 modulo 2 ^ 16 + checksum0 / 2 ^ 16
 checksum = checksum1 modulo 2 ^16 + checksum1 / 2 ^ 16
 The result is a 16-bit checksum calculated from the initial 32-bit plain byte sum

Syntax
The  utility is invoked from the command line according to the following syntax:
 sum [OPTION]... [FILE]...

with the possible option parameters being:
 
 use BSD checksum algorithm, use 1K blocks (defeats )
 , 
 use SYSV checksum algorithm, use 512 bytes blocks
 
 display the help screen and exit
 
 output version information and exit

Example of use:
$ echo Hello > testfile
$ sum testfile
36978     1

Example of -s use in GNU sum:
$ echo Hello > testfile
$ sum -s testfile
510 1 testfile

Example of using standard input, -r and printf to avoid newline:
$ printf Hello | sum -r
08401     1

See also
 GNU Core Utilities
 UnxUtils port to native Win32

References

External links
 sum in The Single UNIX ® Specification, Version 2, 1997, opengroup.org – does not specify checksum algorithm
 C.4 Utilities in The Open Group Base Specifications Issue 7, 2018 edition, opengroup.org – indicates sum as removed
 
  – manual pages from GNU coreutils
  – states the sum algorithms in options -o1 and -o2 to cksum
 
 
 The Unix Tree, tuhs.org – the source code of old versions of Unix

Linux package management-related software
Unix package management-related software
Linux security software
Unix security-related software